The Mass in E, Op. 5, is a choral work by American composer Amy Beach. It was the first mass written by an American woman and Beach's first acclaimed composition. The Mass is a 75-minute work for chorus, quartet, organ, and orchestra.

Composition
Beach began work on her Mass in E-flat in 1886.

The Handel and Haydn Society premiered the Mass in Boston in 1892. The same group had performed Luigi Cherubini's Deuxième Messe Solenelle in D minor in 1883 and played selections from Bach's Mass in B minor in 1887. There are parallels in overall structure, and in some phrases, between Beach's Mass and Cherubini's. Beach's Mass was not performed again until the 1980s. It has been recorded (see Discography).

The Mass is in five sections: Kyrie, Gloria in 4 movements, Credo in 4 movements, Sanctus, and Agnus Dei. Written in a Romantic style, the Mass is rich in harmony and tonality. It was praised for its contrast in instrumentation and the solos for harp, cello, English horn, and oboe.

Beach was apparently unfamiliar with how Latin is stressed, as accents in the music may not agree with those in expected in words such as 'altissimus'.

Influences

In movements of the Gloria, most prominently in the "Quoniam," Beach uses double-dotted rhythms that also appear in Cherubini's Kyrie.  These rhythms give a march-like quality to the movement. They are paired with trumpets and drums to evoke a sense of the Church Militant. Beach's frequently modulates to third-related keys, as in "Laudamus te", in which she uses the keys of E major, G major, E minor, and C major. Beach frequently uses C major to indicate heaven or light; here, it refers to divinity.

Reception
The premiere in 1892 was reviewed in 27 newspapers, 18 in Boston and 9 "out of town." One criticism was that the opening solo trio in the "Laudamus te" had "pitch and ensemble problems."  These may have been due to insufficient instrumental support, or the fact that this was a first performance. In general, critics agreed that the work placed Beach "among the foremost rank of American composers."

One recording of Beach's Mass, by the Michael May Festival Chorus in 1989, was made without a full orchestra. The performance was criticized for inaccurate tempos, inappropriate rearrangements, and overall interpretation. No scholarly reviews have been made of the other recording, from 1995, by the Stow Festival Chorus and Orchestra.

Discography
Amy Beach: Grand Mass in E major. Performed by the Michael May Festival Chorus. Compact disc, 1989, Newport Classic 60008
Amy Beach: Grand Mass in E major. Performed by the Stow Festival Chorus and Orchestra. Albany Records, 1995, TROY 179

References

Sources
Fried Block, Adrienne:  Amy Beach, Passionate Victorian: The Life and Work of an American Composer, 1867-1944.  New York: Oxford University Press, 1998.
Fried Block, Adrienne: "St. Peter: an oratorio and Grand Mass in E Major" (in Record Reviews)  American Music, Vol. 10, No. 2  (Summer, 1992), pp. 229–232. (St. Peter: an Oratorio is a work by John Knowles Paine, 1839-1906)

External links

1886 compositions
Beach
Compositions by Amy Beach